The Gimnasio de Los Cerros is a private religious primary and secondary school associated with the Opus Dei, located in Bogotá, Colombia. Founded in 1964, the school has about 800 students (as of 2009). During the afternoons, the school provides extracurricular activities, such as music, football, basketball and volleyball.

External links
 

Schools in Bogotá
International Baccalaureate schools in Colombia
1964 establishments in Colombia
Educational institutions established in 1964